Mutya ng Pilipinas 2000 was the 32nd edition of Mutya ng Pilipinas. It was held at the AFP Theater in Camp Aguinaldo, Quezon City, Metro Manila on May 13, 2000.

At the end of the event, Ritchie Ocampo crowned Josephine Canonizado as Mutya ng Pilipinas Asia Pacific 2000. Including her crowned are the new court of winners: Marie Pearl Acas was named First Runner-Up, Christine Anne de Jesus was named Second Runner-Up, Peachy Manzano was named Third Runner-Up, and Macbeth Abuzo was named Fourth Runner-Up.

Results
Color keys
  The contestant Won in an International pageant.
  The contestant was a Runner-up in an International pageant.
  The contestant was not able to compete in an International pageant.
  The contestant did not place.

Contestants
25 delegates have been selected to compete in this year.

Withdrawals
 Joy Anne Morales, 19, 5'8", Filipino Community of the United Kingdom
 Kristen Maua, 18, 5'10", Filipino Community of the USA

References

External links
 Official Mutya ng Pilipinas website
  Mutya ng Pilipinas 2012 is on!

2000 beauty pageants
2000 in the Philippines
2000